Mint Field is a Mexican shoegaze trio from Playas de Tijuana, Mexico. The group consists of vocalist and guitarist Estrella Sanchez, drummer Callum Brown, and percussion and synth player Amor Amezcua.

History
Mint Field released their first EP in 2015, titled Primeras Salidas. This led to them being booked for the 2015 edition of Coachella. The trio released their first full-length album in 2018, titled Pasar de Las Luces. In 2020, the trio followed up that release with their second full-length album, Sentimiento Mundial, which was released on September 25. The album received positive reviews.

References

Musical groups from Tijuana